Trithuria inconspicua is a small aquatic herb of the family Hydatellaceae that is only found in New Zealand.

Description

Trithuria inconspicua is a small (~4 cm) fresh water lily endemic to New Zealand. This lily grows in 5–7 meters of water and is restricted to the fresh water lakes of Northland and Fiordland regions of the North and South Island, respectively. Consisting of multiple 20–40 mm small tussocks and fibrous roots the plant is often partially buried under sediment or algae with only the leaf tips exposed. As the plant is Monoicous individual male and female flowers are found on the same plant, however, in nature plants containing flowers of both sexes are rare. The male flowers consist of bright red 10 mm long filaments, whilst the female flowers are yellow-brown and contain 5-10 styles bunched at the apex.

There are two subspecies, Trithuria inconspicua subsp. inconspicua is found in dune lakes of Northland in the far north of the North Island, and T. inconspicua subsp. brevistyla is found in glacial lakes of the southern South Island (Smissen R.D., Ford K.A. Champion, P.D. and Heenan, P.B., Australian Systematic Botany 32(1): 1-11 (2019). http://www.nzflora.info/factsheet/taxon/Trithuria-inconspicua.html

The first flowering plant?
Based on molecular data from a single plastid gene (rbcL)T. inconspicua was originally believed to a monocot. However, a more recent study using multiple genetic loci, supported by a subsequent re-evaluation of morphological characteristics, now places T. inconspicua as a sister group with the water lilies (Nymphaeales). This new placement of T. inconspicua means only a single lineage of flowering plant is thought to be older, that being the woody New Caledonian shrub Amborella trichopoda.

The predominant view that Amborella represents the oldest flowering plant was recently challenged in a study by Goremykini et al (2013), who showed that when highly variable sites were removed from the dataset, T. inconspicua was consistently identified as the oldest angiosperm lineage. This proposal has attracted criticism from Drew et al (2014), who argued that the basal placement of T. inconspicua is an artifact of the variable site filtering method used by Goremykini et al (2013). One of the main reasons why people are interested in this question is that placing T. inconspicua at the base of the angiosperm lineage would suggest the first angiosperms were soft bodied aquatic plants, rather than a woody terrestrial plants like Amborella. These competing theories have been given the light hearted monikers "wet and wild" and "dark and disturbed".

Conservation status
Trithuria inconspicua is seriously threatened due to the competition by the introduced bladder wort (Utricularia gibba) as well as other fresh water weeds.

References

Nymphaeales
Aquatic plants
Flora of New Zealand
Taxa named by Thomas Frederic Cheeseman
Dioecious plants